The Tera Computer Company was a manufacturer of high-performance computing software and hardware, founded in 1987 in Washington, D.C. and moved 1988 to Seattle, Washington by James Rottsolk and Burton Smith. The company's first supercomputer product, named MTA, featured interleaved multi-threading, i.e. a barrel processor.  It also had no data cache, relying instead on switching between threads for latency tolerance, and used a deeply pipelined memory system to handle many simultaneous requests, with address randomization to avoid memory hot spots.

Upon acquiring the Cray Research division of Silicon Graphics in 2000, the company was renamed to Cray Inc.

See also 
 Heterogeneous Element Processor

References 

Software companies based in Seattle
Computer companies established in 1987
Computer companies disestablished in 2000
Software companies established in 1987
Silicon Graphics
Defunct software companies of the United States
Defunct computer companies of the United States